Peter Bourgade (October 17, 1845 – May 17, 1908) was a French-born American prelate of the Catholic Church. He served as Bishop of Tucson (1885–1899) and Archbishop of Santa Fe (1899–1908).

Biography

Early life and priesthood
Bourgade was born on October 17, 1845 in Vollore-Ville, Puy-de-Dôme, to Claude and Marie (née Chapet) Bourgade. He received his early education under the Brothers of the Christian Schools and completed his classical studies at the Jesuit college of Billom. He studied for the priesthood at Saint-Sulpice Seminary, receiving his minor orders during that time.

In 1869, during his fifth year at Saint-Sulpice, Bourgade and five other seminarians were recruited by the newly-consecrated Bishop Jean-Baptiste Salpointe for the missions in the American Southwest. The group sailed from Brest in September 1869 and traveled by railroad and stagecoach to Las Cruces, New Mexico, where Salpointe ordained Bourgade to the priesthood on November 30, 1869.

Following his ordination, Bourgade was named pastor of Immaculate Conception Church in Yuma, Arizona. However, in the summer of 1873, ill health forced him to return to France for two years. He returned to the United States in 1875 and was sent to San Elizario, Texas, where he served as pastor for six years and distinguished himself by opening a parochial school under the Sisters of Loreto in 1879. In 1881 he was transferred to St. Vincent de Paul Church in Silver City, New Mexico, where he built a convent, hospital, and academy for the Sisters of Mercy.

Episcopal career
On February 7, 1885, Bourgade was appointed Vicar Apostolic of Arizona and titular bishop of Thaumacus by Pope Leo XIII. He received his episcopal consecration on the following May 1 from Archbishop Jean-Baptiste Lamy, with Archbishop Salpointe and Bishop Joseph Projectus Machebeuf serving as co-consecrators. The vicariate was elevated to the Diocese of Tucson on May 8, 1897 and Bourgade became its first bishop. He there established twelve schools and an orphanage and also rebuilt the Cathedral of Saint Augustine.

Bourgade was named the fourth Archbishop of Santa Fe on January 7, 1899. He served as archbishop for nine years, and his last annual report to Rome showed the archdiocese contained a Catholic population of 167,000 people, 45 churches with resident priests, and 340 missions. He was in poor health for most of his tenure and received John Baptist Pitaval as an auxiliary bishop in 1902.

In May 1908, due to his failing health, Bourgade was sent to Mercy Hospital in Chicago and placed under the care of Dr. John Benjamin Murphy. He died there two weeks later on May 17, at age 62. He is buried in the Cathedral of St. Francis of Assisi.

References

1845 births
1908 deaths
French expatriates in the United States
People from Puy-de-Dôme
French Roman Catholic missionaries
French Roman Catholic bishops in North America
Catholic Church in Arizona
Roman Catholic archbishops of Santa Fe
Roman Catholic bishops of Tucson
Roman Catholic missionaries in the United States
Seminary of Saint-Sulpice (France) alumni